Middletown Friends Meetinghouse is a historic Quaker meeting house at 435 Middletown Road in Lima, Middletown Township, Delaware County, Pennsylvania, United States.  It is one of the oldest Friends meetinghouses in what was originally Chester County. 

The first mention of an organized Friends meeting in Middletown Township was in 1686.  The  location and construction of a meetinghouse was noted in 1699 and the Middletown Friends Meetinghouse was completed in 1702.  

During the 1790s, the building was doubled in size through the addition of a separate apartment.  In the 1880s, the meetinghouse was reconfigured creating a more church-like appearance and orientation.

The Middletown Friends meetinghouse is an active worship center.

John Edwards, the Congressman from Pennsylvania is interred at the Middletown Friends Meetinghouse cemetery.

References

External links
 

1702 establishments in Pennsylvania
18th-century Quaker meeting houses
Cemeteries in Delaware County, Pennsylvania
Churches completed in 1702
Churches in Delaware County, Pennsylvania
Historic American Buildings Survey in Pennsylvania
Middletown Township, Delaware County, Pennsylvania
Quaker meeting houses in Pennsylvania